Oscar Domingo Peppo (born 6 July 1958) is an Argentine politician. He was elected governor of the Chaco Province in 2015 (with 55.42% of the vote). In the early 1980s, he received a degree in construction, hydraulic and civil engineering in Resistencia and later worked as technical representative and general coordinator of the silo plants for a company. He also previously served as mayor of Villa Ángela. On  he was appointed Argentinian ambassador to Paraguay.

References

Governors of Chaco Province
Justicialist Party politicians
People from Santo Tomé, Corrientes
1958 births
Living people
National University of the Northeast alumni
Mayors of places in Argentina
Ambassadors of Argentina to Paraguay
21st-century Argentine politicians